WSKZ (106.5 FM) is a commercial radio station in Chattanooga, Tennessee.  The station operates under a classic rock format and is branded as KZ106.  The station is one of four stations operating in the Chattanooga broadcast area by Cumulus Media.  Its studios are located on Pineville Road in Chattanooga, and its transmitter is located in Signal Mountain.

History
The station became WSKZ in August 1978, which they were formerly co-owned with their nearby AM station WGOW during its early years but by 1981 the station became a Top 40/CHR format in which WSKZ is the only FM radio station in Chattanooga that broadcast a fully-fledged Top 40/CHR station. But beginning in 1985, unlike most Top 40 stations, WSKZ began fledging into a similar "Rock-40" format lean (similar to KEGL in the Dallas-Fort Worth Metroplex in Texas). Its "rock" formula was dropped when the format began adding more mainstream titles during the middle of 1987.

The station flipped back to "Rock 40" in connection to its competition against a "new" Top 40/CHR station WBDX in 1989. WSKZ continued its run as a Top 40/CHR station until 1994 when they decided to change to their current Classic Rock format.

External links
KZ 106 official website

SKZ
SKZ
Cumulus Media radio stations
Classic rock radio stations in the United States